CSRA may refer to:

 The Central Savannah River Area, a trading and marketing region in the U.S. states of Georgia and South Carolina.

 The Civil Service Reform Act of 1978, a reorganization of the executive branch of the U.S. federal government, following the Watergate scandal. 

 The Pendleton Civil Service Reform Act, an 1883 law establishing a merit system for U.S. federal employees.
 Consejo de Salud Rural Andino, an American non-profit organization

 CSRA Inc., an information technology company that performs contract work for the U.S. federal government.